Perehnoiv is a village in Lviv Raion (district) of Lviv Oblast of western Ukraine. It belongs to Hlyniany hromada, one of the hromadas of Ukraine.

History 
The village was first mentioned in 1397.

Village "Prekgnoiowf" is displayed on the map of Ukraine (1650) by Guillaume Le Vasseur de Beauplan.

In 1726, wooden church was built in the village. The church was destroyed by the storm at the beginning of the 20th century.

New Presentation of Mary brick church was built in 1907 (architect Vasyl Nahirnyi).

References 

Lviv Oblast